The Roman Catholic Archdiocese of Fianaranintsoa is one of the five Catholic Metropolitan Latin Archdioceses in Madagascar, yet depends on the missionary Roman Congregation for the Evangelization of Peoples.

Its cathedral archiepiscopal see is Cathédrale du Saint-Nom de Jésus, dedicated to the Name of Jesus, in Fianarantsoa, Fianarantsoa province.

The present Archbishop is Fulgence Rabemahafaly.

Ecclesiastical province 
Its suffragan sees are :
 Diocese of Ambositra, a daughter see
 Diocese of Farafangana 
 Diocese of Ihosy 
 Diocese of Mananjary, a daughter

History 
 Established on 1913.05.10 as Apostolic Vicariate of Fianarantsoa, on vast territory split off from the then Apostolic Vicariate of Central Madagascar.
 Lost territories on 1935.06.18 to establish Apostolic Prefecture of Vatomandry (now Metropolitan Archdiocese of Toamasina) and on 1938.01.08 to establish Apostolic Prefecture of Morondava (now a diocese)
 Promoted on 1955.09.14 as Diocese of Fianarantsoa
 Elevated to Metropolitan Archdiocese of Fianarantsoa on 11 December 1958 during Madagascar's transition from French colony to independence.
 Lost territories again to establish suffragans : on 1968.04.09 Diocese of Mananjary and on 1999.06.03 Diocese of Ambositra 
 Enjoyed a Papal visit from Pope John Paul II in May 1989.

Statistics 
As per 2014, it pastorally served 831,106 Catholics (56.5% of 1,471,000 total) on 29,400 km2 in 42 parishes and 5 missions with 126 priests (60 diocesan, 66 religious), 525 lay religious (210 brothers, 315 sisters) and 78 seminarians.

It had a total population of about 1,153,750 in 2004. About 40.5% of the residents were Catholic. 121 Priests operate in the Archdiocese, making for a ratio of 3,863 Catholics per Priest.

Bishops

Ordinaries
(all Latin Rite; initially European missionary members of Latin orders) 

Apostolic Vicars of Fianarantsoa 
 Charles Givelet, Jesuit Order (S.J.) (born France) (1913.05.16 – death 1935.12.09), Titular Bishop of Gindarus (1913.05.16 – 1935.12.09)
 Xavier Ferdinand J. Thoyer, S.J. (born France) (1936.12.23 – 1955.09.14 see below), Titular Bishop of Thuburbo minus (1936.12.23 – 1955.09.14)

Suffragan Bishop of Fianarantsoa 
 Xavier Ferdinand J. Thoyer, S.J. (see above 1955.09.14 – 1958.12.11 see below)

Metropolitan Archbishops of Fianarantsoa 
 Xavier Ferdinand J. Thoyer, S.J. (see above 1958.12.11 – retired 1962.04.02), emeritate as Titular Archbishop of Odessus (1962.04.02 – death 1970.10.07)
 Gilbert Ramanantoanina, S.J. (first native incumbent) (1962.04.02 – death 1991.01.26), also President of Episcopal Conference of Madagascar (1966 – 1971); succeeded as former Titular Bishop of Acmonia (1960.01.12 – 1962.04.02) and Auxiliary Bishop of Fianarantsoa (1960.01.12 – 1962.04.02)
  Philibert Randriambololona, S.J. (1992.12.17 – retired 2002.10.01); previously Coadjutor Bishop of Antsirabe (Madagascar) (1988.09.01 – 1989.06.19), succeeded as Bishop of Antsirabe (1989.06.19 – 1992.12.17)
 Fulgence Rabemahafaly (2002.10.01 – ...), also Apostolic Administrator of suffragan Ambositra (Madagascar) (2002.12.01 – 2005.06.24), President of Episcopal Conference of Madagascar (2006 – 2012.11); previously Bishop of Ambositra (1999.06.03 – 2002.10.01).

Auxiliary Bishop
Gilbert Ramanantoanina, S.J. (1960-1962), appointed Bishop here

Other priests of this diocese who became bishops
Fulgence Rabemahafaly, appointed Bishop of Ambositra in 1999; later returned here as Archbishop
Vincent Rakotozafy, appointed Bishop of Tôlagnaro in 2001
Odon Marie Arsène Razanakolona, appointed Bishop of Ambanja in 1998

See also 
 List of Catholic dioceses in Madagascar

Sources and external links 
 GCatholic with Google satellite photo - data for all sections
 Catholic-hierarchy.org profile of Archdiocese

References

Fianarantsoa
Roman Catholic dioceses in Madagascar
1913 establishments in Madagascar
A